Nova Paul (born 1973) is a New Zealand Māori filmmaker of Te Uri Ro Roi and Te Parawhau/Nga Puhi descent. 

Paul completed a Bachelor of Arts in art history at the University of Otago in 1994 and a Master of Arts at Auckland University of Technology in 2000. Her short film Hawaiki was shown at the Sundance Film Festival in 2023.

Filmography

References

1973 births

Living people
New Zealand women film directors
University of Otago alumni